This is opinion polling for the Costa Rican general election in 2018.

References 

2018